Kalu Michael (born November 11, 2000) is a Nigerian professional footballer, who currently plays for  Al-Hawija SC in the Iraq Division One.

Career

Wau Salaam FC
Kalu Michael started his football career after moving to South Sudan to live with an uncle. He was 15 when he was scouted and signed by Wau Salaam FC. After 1 year he was promoted to the first team, where he won 1 South Sudan Football Championship and 2 South Sudan National Cup. He was also voted the best defender at the 2016 South Sudan National Cup at age 16.

Jazeera SC
In 2018 after his 18th birthday he signed for Jazeera Sports Club a newly promoted Somali First Division team and helped them to a 6th position finish, retaining their Somali First Division status for the 2019/2020 season.
On the 2nd of January 2019 Kalu was awarded with the Fair Play Award at the Somali Football Awards for the 2018/2019 season

ACS Hayableh
On 29 October 2020, Kalu was unveiled by ACS Hayableh on a 1-year contract, making him the 4th foreign player on their roster.

Samarra SC
After an incredible season with ACS Hayableh, Kalu was offered a 2-year contract extension but rather he chose to move to Iraqi Premier League newly promoted side Samarra SC

Ghaz Al-Shamal
After Terminating his contract with Samarra SC in January because non payment of salary, Kalu Joined an Iraq Division One Side Ghaz Al-Shamal for the remaining of the 2021-2022 Season

Honours

Club
Al-Salam FC
 South Sudan Football Championship: 2017
 South Sudan National Cup: 2016, 2017

Individual
 Best Defender Zone 2: South Sudan National Cup: 2016
 Fair Play Award: Somali Football Awards 2019

References 

Category:Al-Salam FC players

2000 births
Association football forwards
Nigerian footballers
Nigerian expatriate footballers
Living people